Valeriu Duminică (born April 8, 1987) is a Moldovan judoka. He competed at the 2016 Summer Olympics in the men's 81 kg event, in which he was eliminated in the third round by Matteo Marconcini.

References

External links
 

1987 births
Living people
Moldovan male judoka
Judoka at the 2016 Summer Olympics
Olympic judoka of Moldova
European Games competitors for Moldova
Judoka at the 2015 European Games
20th-century Moldovan people
21st-century Moldovan people